Spiritual Love, also known as  Ghost Bride  or The Phantom Bride is a 1987 Hong Kong fantasy comedy film directed by David Lai and Taylor Wong and starring Chow Yun-fat, Cherie Chung, Pauline Wong and Deanie Ip.

Plot
A man named Pu Yung-tsai lives with his cousin who is a student Feng shui and Maoshan. Yung-tsai buys an antique desk from a second-hand shop and inside is a suicide letter written by a young woman called Wei Hsiao-tieh. Yung-tsai replies to the letter and gives up 3 years of his life, so the woman is able to come back to Earth as a ghost and get away from her forced marriage in the afterlife. When Yung-tsai splits up with his girlfriend, May, because he caught her having an affair, he begins a relationship with Hsiao-tieh. May wants to get back together with Yung-tsai because her rich boyfriend has dumped her and she is pregnant. She stages a fake suicide attempt to win back Yung-tsai but it backfires and she dies.

May then returns as a ghost in a night club and Yung-tsai, his cousin, his cousin's mentor and his friend attempt to get rid of her spirit. She chases them all around the club trying to kill them. Hsiao-tieh makes a deal with her husband to go back to him, if he will save Yung-tsai and his friends. The husband then turns up and consumes May's ghost before returning to his own realm with Hsiao-tieh.

Cast
Chow Yun-fat as Pu Yung-tsai
Cherie Chung as Wei Hsiao-tieh
Pauline Wong as May 
Deanie Ip as Sai Chin-hua
Hon Yee-sang as King Ghost
Alex Ng as Pu's deaf-mute friend 
Paul Chun as Pu's boss 
Luk Yik-sang
Luk Ying-hung as policeman
Yu Kwok-lok as hotel manager
Fung Yuen-chi as gangster
Kan Tat-wah as bodyguard
Fan Wing-wah as thug
Lee Hang as Taoist
Hung San-nam as bodyguard
Jackson Ng as bodyguard
Tang Chiu-yau as bodyguard
Wong Wai-fai as bodyguard

Accolades

Home Media

VHS

VCD

DVD

External links

References

1987 films
1980s fantasy comedy films
1980s comedy horror films
Hong Kong fantasy comedy films
Hong Kong comedy horror films
Hong Kong supernatural horror films
Hong Kong ghost films
1980s supernatural horror films
Hong Kong slapstick comedy films
1980s Cantonese-language films
Golden Harvest films
Films set in Hong Kong
Films shot in Hong Kong
Films directed by David Lai
Films directed by Taylor Wong
1987 comedy films
1980s Hong Kong films